"The Ghosts That Haunt Me" is a song by Crash Test Dummies and was the second single from their 1991 debut album The Ghosts That Haunt Me.

Music video
The music video features the band performing at a puppet show featuring a couple of skeletons.

Charts

References

1991 singles
Crash Test Dummies songs
Songs written by Brad Roberts
1991 songs